Kathleen M. Boozang (born April 21, 1959) is dean and professor of law at Seton Hall University School of Law. Boozang joined Seton Hall in 1990 after practicing law for several years. In July 2015, she became the eighth dean of Seton Hall Law.

Biography 
She launched the Health Law & Policy Program (1993), which has been ranked in the Top 10 of U.S. News & World Report.

Works, honors and recognition 
Boozang was elected to the American Bar Foundation in 2008 and the American Law Institute  in 2009.

Boozang was honored by The New Jersey Law Journal, which gave her a Lifetime Achievement Award in 2016 and named her to its list of Top Women in the Law in 2018.

References

Seton Hall University School of Law faculty
American legal scholars
Boston College alumni
Yale Law School alumni
1959 births
Living people
Hastings Center Fellows
Deans of law schools in the United States
Women deans (academic)
Academic journal editors
Washington University School of Law alumni